Emmanuel Quarshie (May 6, 1953 – September 16, 2013) was a Ghanaian international footballer and a coach who played as an attacking midfielder.

Biography
Emmanuel Quarshie played 1 game in 1978 African Cup of Nations, he was the captain of Ghana's champion selection in 1982 African Cup of Nations with 5 games played.

At club level, he is the captain of Sekondi Hasaacas, with whom he won the West African Club Championship in 1982. He then moved to Egypt and joined Zamalek SC, winning its first African Cup of Champion Clubs in 1984. He plays the last years of his career in Bahrain's Al Muharraq Club.

He then became coach of Sekondi Hasaacas from 2001 to 2002 and All Stars from 2007 to 2013.

Hospitalized in Egypt in July 2013 with the help of Zamalek club, he died from throat cancer in September at the age of 60 years in Takoradi.

Honors

Club

Sekondi Hasaacas FC
Ghana Premier League (1): 1977
WAFU Cup (1): 1982
SWAG Cup(1): 1982-83

Zamalek
Egyptian Premier League (1): 1983-84
African Cup of Champions Clubs (1): 1984

International
Ghana
 African Cup of Nations (2): 1978, 1982

References

Ghanaian footballers
Ghanaian expatriate footballers
Ghana international footballers
1978 African Cup of Nations players
1980 African Cup of Nations players
1982 African Cup of Nations players
Zamalek SC players
FC 105 Libreville players
Ghanaian football managers
Deaths from cancer in Ghana
Deaths from oral cancer
2013 deaths
Egyptian Premier League players
Association football midfielders
1953 births
Sekondi Hasaacas F.C. managers
Expatriate footballers in Bahrain
Ghanaian expatriate sportspeople in Bahrain
Expatriate footballers in Egypt
Ghanaian expatriate sportspeople in Egypt
Expatriate footballers in Gabon
Ghanaian expatriate sportspeople in Gabon
Ghana Premier League top scorers